Robin Kakati (1909-1996) was an Indian politician. He was a Member of Parliament, representing Assam in the Rajya Sabha, the upper house of India's Parliament as a member of the Janata Party.

References

Rajya Sabha members from Assam
Indian National Congress politicians
Janata Party politicians
1909 births
1996 deaths
Indian National Congress politicians from Assam